Balıqçılar (also, Pamyat’ Lenina) is a village and municipality in the Lankaran Rayon of Azerbaijan.  It has a population of 2,455.

References 

Populated places in Lankaran District